Bernhard Purkrabek (born 7 May 1954) is an Austrian bobsledder. He competed in the four man event at the 1980 Winter Olympics.

References

1954 births
Living people
Austrian male bobsledders
Olympic bobsledders of Austria
Bobsledders at the 1980 Winter Olympics
Sportspeople from Tyrol (state)